New Beginnings is the debut studio album by American rapper Reason. It was released on October 9, 2020, by Top Dawg Entertainment and Caroline Records. The album includes guest features from Schoolboy Q, Ab-Soul, Isaiah Rashad, JID, Vince Staples, Rapsody, Mereba, and Alemeda. Production was primarily handled by in-house TDE producer Kal Banx, among others.

Background
The album was initially planned to be released in March 2020, but was delayed due to the COVID-19 pandemic. Reason explained the album's delay: "I had to get rid of every fear, anxiety, doubt, and negative mindset to make this project". In an interview with Paper, Reason spoke on the album, saying:

Singles and promotion
On November 13, 2019, the first single, "Flick It Up", was released, featuring Ab-Soul. The second song "Show Stop", was released on January 24, 2020, featuring background vocals from Kendrick Lamar. On March 15, the third single was released, titled "Pop Shit", featuring Schoolboy Q. The fourth single was released on September 25, titled "Sauce", featuring Vince Staples.

Track listing

References

2020 debut albums
Reason (rapper) albums
Top Dawg Entertainment albums
Albums postponed due to the COVID-19 pandemic
Albums produced by Tae Beast
Albums produced by Illmind